Jalan Semanggol - Changkat Lobak in official name or Jalan Bukit Merah in local or unofficial name (Perak state route A111) is a major road in Perak, Malaysia. It is also a main route to North–South Expressway Northern Route via Bukit Merah Interchange.

List of junctions

Bukit Merah